Bland County may refer to:
 Bland County, Virginia, United States
 Bland County, New South Wales, Australia